Piute may refer to:

 Piute County, Utah, United States
 Piute ground squirrel, species of rodent
 Piute Mountains, mountain range of Southern California
 Piute Range, mountain range of the Mojave Desert
 Piute Pass, a mountain pass of the Sierra Nevada
 Piute Pass Archeological District, a mountain pass and archaeological district of the Mojave Desert
 Piute Creek, a stream of the Mojave Desert
 Piute Ponds, with Big Piute and Little Piute, small lakes to the southeast of Rosamond, California

See also
 Paiute